Les Bêtises is a 2015 French comedy film written and directed by Rose and Alice Philippon.

Cast 
 Jérémie Elkaïm as François
 Sara Giraudeau as Sonia
 Jonathan Lambert as Fabrice
 Anne Alvaro as Élise
 Alexandre Steiger as Philippe
 Jacques Weber as André
 Frédéric Pierrot as the civil servant
 Cécile Fisera as Young Élise 
 Marie Seux as Irène 
 Béatrice de Staël as Édith 
 Yvon Wust as René

Accolades

References

External links 
 

2015 films
2015 comedy films
2010s French-language films
French comedy films
2015 directorial debut films
2010s French films